Igor Omrčen (born 26 September 1980 in Split) is a retired volleyball player from Croatia. He twice became top scorer at the Men's European Volleyball League: in 2004 and 2006. Omrčen played as a professional in Italy for 12 years. In 2019, Omrčen ended his career playing in Japan's V.League for Toyoda Gosei Trefuerza.

Omrčen has been described as the greatest Croatian volleyball player of all time.

References

External links
 

1980 births
Living people
Croatian men's volleyball players
Sportspeople from Split, Croatia
Expatriate volleyball players in Italy
Expatriate volleyball players in Japan
Croatian expatriate sportspeople in Italy
Croatian expatriate sportspeople in Japan